The Federation of Damanhur, often called simply Damanhur, is a commune, ecovillage, and spiritual community situated in the Piedmont region of northern Italy about  north of the city of Turin. It is located in the foothills of the Alps in the Chiusella Valley, bordering on the Gran Paradiso National Park. The community has its own constitution and currency, the Credito.

Damanhur is named after the Egyptian city of Damanhur which was the site of a temple dedicated to Horus.

It  was founded in 1975 by Oberto Airaudi with around 24 followers, and by 2000 the number had grown to 800. The group holds a mix of New Age and  neopagan beliefs.

Damanhur's supporters claim the growth and activity of the community has revitalized the local area.

The Federation of Damanhur has centers in Europe, America, and Japan.

Life at Damanhur 

The constitution began with 3 bodies of Damanhur: The School of Meditation (ritual tradition) Social (social theory, social realization) and The Game of Life (experimentation and dynamics, life as a game, change). A fourth body was recently added, Technarcate (individual inner refinement).

Citizens participate in one of 4 levels, depending on their desired involvement: A, B, C, or D.  Class A citizens share all resources and live on site full-time.  Class B citizens contribute to financial goals and live on site a minimum of 3 days a week.  Class C and D citizens live anywhere.  (page 102, Merrifield, 2006)  Class A & B citizens participate fully in The School of Meditation, Social, and the Game of Life.  Class C citizens participate fully in The School of Meditation.

Citizens participate in one of several ways, depending on their personal nature.  Ways include the Way of the Oracle, the Way of the Monk, the Way of the Knight, the Way of Health, the Way of the Word, the Way of Art & Work, and many others.  Most citizens live in houses of 10-20 people each, federated together into the Federation of Damanhur.

Marriage works on a renewal basis, for a period of so many years before renewal.  Conception is timed for auspicious birthdays of children.

From 1983 onwards, members have assumed animal names (Sparrow, Prawn, Mole, etc.).

Controversy 
 According to the President of the National Psychological Abuses Observatory, Patrizia Santovecchi, among the characteristics of Damanhur there are those typical of sects, including the lack of possibility to go out freely due to blackmail, manipulation through the siege syndrome, for which outside the sect are all the enemies constituted by negative energies, and, moreover, the impossibility of criticism and the imposition of total obedience, the estrangement from family members, the complete depersonalization in the individual under various aspects, including for example the assignment of a new name within the community, the deprivation of any kind of decision-making capacity, the need to ask the guru what to do.

Notes

References

External links

1975 establishments in Italy
Ecovillages
Micronations
New Age communities
New religious movements
Religious organizations established in 1975
Subterranea (geography)
Utopian movements